Northwestern High School is a public high school in West Salem, Ohio.  It is the only high school in the Northwestern Local Schools district, which is located in north-west Wayne County, Ohio.  Their nickname is the Huskies.

History
Northwestern was created in 1951 from a merger of the school districts in Chester Township, Congress, and West Salem.  The school name came from the district's northwestern location within Wayne County.  Chester basketball coach Roy Bates chose the school colors of blue and gray, which were a combination of  the basketball uniforms of Chester, which were blue, and Congress, which were gray.  Bates would also become the first basketball coach at Northwestern. Bates chose the nickname of "Huskies".

Athletics

Northwestern is one of eight high schools that compete in the Wayne County Athletic League.

 2008 Girls' Volleyball Team District Champions
 2008 Wrestling- 1 state placer
-(Jake Ewing-3rd Place in State)
 2008 Wrestling- 2 state qualifiers 
2007 Girls' Volleyball Team District Champions
2007 Football League Champions 
 2007 Track- 1 state placer
2007 Wrestling- 2 state placers
-(Frank Read-5th Place in State)

-(Brent Runkle-7th Place in State)

2007 Wrestling- 3 state qualifiers 
2007 (February) Wrestling- "Seniors Spencer Hershey Jr., Brent Runkle, Frank "The Tank" Read and Josh Cutter, along with junior Mat Schaefer, have all topped 100 career wins already.  In fact, their combined 637 victories are believed to make them the winningest quintet in area history." Quoted in the Daily Record 
2006 School Record of 6 state qualifiers in wrestling
2006 Football League Champions (10-0)
2006 Second Football Playoff Team in School History.
2005, 2006 WCAL Wrestling Champions 
2005 Wrestling- 1 State Qualifier 
2005 Sectional Wrestling Champions
2005 Football Regionals (10-3)
2005 First Football Playoff Team in School History. 
 2004 Wrestling- 1 state placer
-(Josh Ewing- State Runner Up)
2004 Wrestling- 3 state qualifiers 
2004 Golf League Champions
The school is known for its strong tradition in basketball in the 2000s, with 5 league championships, (2003, 2004, 2005, 2007, 2011, 2015, 2017, 2019, 2020 and 3 District Championships, (03, 06, 17) in the 2000s.

In 2017 a Northwestern middle school student would throw 175ft in the discus for track and field, it’s still a wcal record to this day.

Ohio High School Athletic Association State Championships

 Boys' basketball – 1958, 1965 
 Boys' baseball – 1933*, 1959, 1966 
 *title won by West Salem High School prior to consolidation into Northwestern HS.

References

External links
 District website

High schools in Wayne County, Ohio
Public high schools in Ohio